Picromerus is a genus of shield bugs in the family Pentatomidae.

Genera
 Picromerus bidens (Linnaeus, 1758) 
 Picromerus brachypterus Ahmad & Önder, 1990 
 Picromerus conformis (Herrich-Schäffer, 1841) 
 Picromerus elevatus Zhao, Liu & Bu, 2013 
 Picromerus fasciaticeps Zheng & Liu, 1987 
 Picromerus griseus (Dallas, 1851) 
 Picromerus lewisi Scott, 1874 
 Picromerus nigridens (Fabricius, 1803) 
 Picromerus orientalis Rishi & Abbasi, 1973 
 Picromerus pseudobidens Ahmad & Önder, 1990 
 Picromerus viridipunctatus Yang, 1935

References

Asopinae
Pentatomidae genera